Hummelo is a village in the Dutch province of Gelderland. It is located in the municipality of Bronckhorst, about 6 km northwest of Doetinchem.

Hummelo was a separate municipality until 1818, when the area was divided between Ambt Doetinchem and Hummelo en Keppel.
First finds in the area date to the upper Palaeolithic.

Hummelo is known for the rock band Normaal (Normal) which was founded in 1975.

Notable people 
 Koen Huntelaar (born 1998), footballer
  (born 1946), singer and co-founder of Normaal

Gallery

References

External links 
 Official website (in Dutch)

Populated places in Gelderland
Former municipalities of Gelderland
Bronckhorst